Microthia is a genus of fungi within the family Cryphonectriaceae.

References

External links 

Sordariomycetes genera
Diaporthales